Rose and Time is a puzzle-platform video game developed by British indie game developer Sophie Houlden and featuring music by Kevin MacLeod. The game consists of a number of 3D levels which must be navigated while avoiding previous versions of yourself created by time travel. The game was originally released in April 2012 for iOS and Android, having been created as part of the Indie Buskers Game Jam. It was also released on Ouya in July 2013. The game concept originated from a competition idea submitted by theneonheart aka artist and author, Scott Thomas Smith.

Gameplay
The player controls Rose, a young girl in pursuit of a time crystal which she believes will give her the ability to understand time travel, and rescue her parents who are trapped in a time loop. Each stage consists of a series of floating platforms and mechanisms she must navigate to reach the crystal. Upon reaching the crystal, you travel back in time to the start of the level, to find yourself and the crystal are in different positions, and you now have to avoid your past self (and her line of sight) to reach the crystal without causing a time paradox. Many later levels involve managing several versions of your past self, and using them to hold buttons activating doors and platforms.

Aside from moving, the only actions Rose can perform are covering her eyes (to create blind spots for her future selves to pass through) and rewinding time to an earlier point to correct mistakes.

Ouya controversy
In September 2013, Sophie voluntarily withdrew the game from the Ouya marketplace, citing problems with the mishandling of the Ouya "Free the Games Fund" controversy, and assorted missteps by the company. The story was widely circulated in the gaming press, and further fueled criticism of the fund.

A month later, Sophie revealed that she and several other developers had been in talks with Ouya boss Julie Uhrman, and that the terms of the free the games fund had been changed as a result. Satisfied the matter was resolved, she returned the game to the Ouya marketplace.

References

External links

Ouya Listing

2012 video games
Indie video games
IOS games
Puzzle video games
Android (operating system) games
Linux games
MacOS games
Ouya games
Video games developed in the United Kingdom
Video games featuring female protagonists
Windows games